Harriersand is a river island located in the lower reaches of the Weser in Germany.

Harriersand faces the town of Brake, but it has been part of the municipality of Schwanewede since 1 March 1974, as it is more easily accessible from the eastern bank of the river (since 1965 a bridge connects the island to the mainland at the level of the hamlet of Rade). It was previously administered by the town of Brake itself.

As of 30 June 2018, the island had 68 inhabitants, as well as numerous holiday homes.

See also
List of islands of Germany

References

River islands of Germany
Islands of Lower Saxony